Masud Karim (17 February 1936 – 16 November 1996) was a Bangladeshi lyricist. He won Bangladesh National Film Award for Best Lyrics twice for the film Rajanigandha (1982) and Hridoy Theke Hridoy (1994).

Filmography

Film

Album

References

External links

1936 births
1996 deaths
Bangladeshi lyricists
Best Lyricist National Film Award (Bangladesh) winners
People from Khulna